Bernard Stanisław Mond (Spanier) (November 14, 1887 in Stanisławów – July 5, 1957 in Kraków) was a Polish general of the Jewish background  in the interwar period. He fought in the First World War, Polish–Ukrainian War, Polish–Soviet War and Second World War.

Early life 
He was the son of Salomea and Maurycy Spanier, a railway official. In 1907, Bernard graduated from the gymnasium in Brody, having joined a youth organization which agitated for Polish independence. Between 1907 and 1908 he served in the Austro-Hungarian Army. He began studies in the Department of Law at the University of Lviv in 1908, but two years later, he interrupted them to finish an administrative course at the District Railway Authority of Lwów and worked for this department until 1913. Afterwards, he resumed his study of law.

World War I 
At the beginning of World War I, he was called up into the Austro-Hungarian Army where he served as a company commander. He was taken prisoner by the Russians in 1916 and sent to a POW camp. In November 1918, he commanded the "Citadel" section in the defence of Lwów during the Polish–Ukrainian War. He was wounded near Kiev on June 6, 1920 during the Polish-Soviet War. From May to October 1921 he was the commander of the town of Wilno. On December 21, 1932, he was made a brigadier general by the Polish president Ignacy Mościcki, and between 1932 and 1938 he commanded the Polish 6th Infantry Division of the Kraków Army. In 1935, after the death of the Polish leader Józef Piłsudski, Mond was the one who made the funeral arrangements for his former commander.

World War II 
In September 1939, Mond and his division defended the Pszczyna corridor against the German invasion. Surrounded by the Wehrmacht, he capitulated on September 20 at 3 p.m., near Nowe Sioło; and was subsequently imprisoned in German oflags: VII-A Murnau, IV-B Königstein and VI-B Dössel.

After the war 
He returned to Poland in 1946 and took a managerial position in a state travel agency Orbis. In 1950, he was dismissed (most likely because of his political background and/or political views) and had to work as a handyman in a building materials warehouse in Poland.

References 

1887 births
1957 deaths
Austro-Hungarian prisoners of war in World War I
Burials at Rakowicki Cemetery
Commanders of the Order of the Crown (Romania)
Jewish military personnel
Officers of the Order of Polonia Restituta
Military personnel from Ivano-Frankivsk
People from Kolomyia
People from the Kingdom of Galicia and Lodomeria
Polish generals of the Second Polish Republic
19th-century Polish Jews
Polish military personnel of World War II
Polish people of the Polish–Soviet War
Polish people of the Polish–Ukrainian War
Polish people of World War I
Polish prisoners of war
Recipients of the Cross of Independence with Swords
Recipients of the Cross of Valour (Poland)
Recipients of the Gold Cross of Merit (Poland)
Recipients of the Silver Cross of the Virtuti Militari
University of Lviv alumni
World War I prisoners of war held by Russia
World War II prisoners of war held by Germany